Central District may refer to:

Places 
 Central District (Botswana)
 Central district, Plovdiv, Bulgaria
 Central District, Xiamen, China, now Siming District, Fujian
 Central, Hong Kong, also called Central District
 List of Central Districts in Iran
 Central District (Israel)
 Central District, Riga, Latvia
 Central District, Pyongyang, North Korea
 Central District, Cabuyao, Philippines
 Central District (General Junta of Asturias constituency), Spain
 Central District, Taichung, Taiwan
 Central District (Zanzibar), Tanzania
 Central District, Seattle, United States
 Tsentralny District, Minsk, Belarus

Other uses 
 Central District (VHSL), a high school conference of the Virginia High School League
 Central District Football Club, an Australian rules football team

See also
 Central business district
 Central Districts cricket team
 Jung District (disambiguation) (Korean for "Central District")
 Tsentralny District (disambiguation)
 Center District, Ljubljana, Slovenia
 Center District, Maribor, Slovenia